Call Girl "from MIE to you" is the second studio album by Japanese singer MIE. The album was released on October 5, 1982 to coincide with the film . It was also her last solo album under Victor Entertainment. The album was reissued on October 24, 2007 as Call Girl "from MIE to you" +2, with two bonus tracks.

Track listing 
Side A

Side B

2007 CD bonus tracks

References

External links

 
 

1982 albums
Mie albums
Japanese-language albums
Victor Entertainment albums